Shopping channels (also known in British English as teleshopping) are a type of television program or specialty channel devoted to home shopping. Their formats typically feature live presentations and demonstrations of products, hosted by on-air presenters and other spokespeople who provide a sales pitch for the product. Viewers are also instructed on how they can order the product. Shopping channels may focus primarily on mainstream merchandise, or more specialized categories such as high-end fashion and jewelry. The term can also apply to channels whose programming consists exclusively of direct-response advertising and infomercials.

The concept was first popularized in the United States in the 1980s, when Lowell "Bud" Paxson and Roy Speer launched a local cable channel known as the Home Shopping Club—which later launched nationally as the Home Shopping Network (HSN). It later gained competition from QVC, who would eventually acquire HSN in 2017. Home shopping channels originally relied on telephone ordering, but have since been required to emphasize online shopping as part of their business models in order to compete with online-only competitors (while distinguishing themselves with their use of on-air pitches and offers to entice potential customers). In 2015, QVC acquired the retailer Zulily in an effort to expand its presence in online retail. ShopHQ is another US-based shopping channel.

Outside of the US, few of the notable shopping channels are TV Shop, QVC UK in Europe, The Shopping Channel in New Zealand, Shop TV in Philippines and TSC in Canada.

References 

Non-store retailing